Deux and D'eux means "of them" or "about them" while also being the number "two" in French.

2 (number), the natural number following 1 and preceding 3
Two (disambiguation)
Folie à deux, a rare psychiatric syndrome

Geography 

Deux Montagnes, French for Two Mountains
Deux-Montagnes Line (AMT), a commuter railway line operated in the Greater Montreal, Quebec, Canada area
Deux-Montagnes, Quebec, a municipality in southwestern Quebec, Canada
Deux-Sèvres, a French département
Blainville—Deux-Montagnes, a former federal electoral district in Quebec, Canada
Communes of the Deux-Sèvres department, 305 communes of the Deux-Sèvres département, in France.

Entertainment 

D'eux, an album by Canadian singer Céline Dion
Deux (band), a South Korean duo band
Deux Deux, a fictional character who appeared in The Inspector
Folie à Deux, the fifth studio album by Fall Out Boy
Pas de deux, a duet in which ballet steps are performed together.
La Deux, a Belgian national television channel

Cinema 

Two (2002 film), a French film released as Deux in France
Two of Us (2019 film), a French film released as Deux in France
Hot Shots! Part Deux